Nanda Layos Lwin (born August 31, 1971, in London, Ontario) is a Canadian author, music historian, journalist, civil engineer, and educator. He wrote the weekly ChartTalk column, a commentary of the current Canadian music charts; it appeared on canoe.ca from 1997 to 2002 and in The Hamilton Spectator from 2003 to 2006. He is the author and publisher of eight books including Top 40 Hits: The Essential Chart Guide (1999) and Top Albums: The Essential Chart Guide (2003), primarily documenting the chart history of the Canadian music magazine The Record.

Lwin holds a bachelor's degree in civil engineering from the University of Toronto and a master's degree in engineering and public policy from McMaster University and is a licensed professional engineer in Ontario. He is currently teaching civil engineering technology at Seneca College of Applied Arts and Technology.

Books written by Lwin 
Lwin has authored the following books:
 The Record 1994 Chart Almanac (1995).
 The Canadian Singles Chart Book (1996).
 Canada's Top Hits of the Year (1997).
 The 1996 Country Chart Yearbook (1997).
 Canada's Top 1000 Singles (1998).
 Top 40 Hits: The Essential Chart Guide (1999).
 Top Albums: The Essential Chart Guide (2003).
 The Essential 2002 Chart Yearbook (2003).

See also
 Canadian Singles Chart
 Nielsen SoundScan
 Nielsen Broadcast Data Systems
 The Record

External links
Professorial website

References 

1971 births
Living people
Canadian music journalists
Canadian columnists
Canadian civil engineers
Canadian music historians
University of Toronto alumni
McMaster University alumni
Writers from London, Ontario
Writers from Toronto
Canadian writers of Asian descent
Academic staff of Seneca College